Intsia palembanica is a species of flowering plants in the family Fabaceae. The plant common names include Borneo teak, Malacca teak, merbau and Moluccan ironwood where it is native to tropical rainforests in Southeast Asia and the islands of the southwest Pacific. Intsia palembanica differ from Intsia bijuga in the number of leaflets that make up their compound leaves.

Symbolism
On 23 August 2019, the tree, locally known as pokok merbau, officially became the national tree of Malaysia. The then-Prime Minister, Mahathir, stated that it represented the strength and endurance of Malaysia's people.

References

External links

palembanica
Trees of Malesia
Trees of Thailand
Trees of Myanmar
Trees of Bangladesh
Trees of New Guinea
National symbols of Malaysia
Plants described in 1861
Fabales of Asia